FA Youth Cup Finals from 1980 to 1989.

1988–89: Watford vs Manchester City (0–1 and 2–0 aet, 2–1 Aggregate)

1987–88: Arsenal vs Doncaster Rovers (5–0 and 1–1, 6–1 Aggregate)

 (Captain)

1986–87: Coventry City vs Charlton Athletic (1–1 and 1–0 aet, 2–1 Aggregate)
First leg
Score: Charlton 1–1 Coventry
Date: 28 April 1987
Venue: The Valley
Coventry scorer: Craig Middleton

Second leg
Score: Coventry 1–0 Charlton (aet)
Date: 13 May 1987
Venue: Highfield Road
Coventry scorer: Steve Livingstone

 (Captain)

1985–86: Manchester City vs Manchester United (1–1 and 2–0, 3–1 Aggregate)
First leg
Old Trafford, 24 April 1986
Manchester United - Manchester City 1–1 (0–0)
1-0 49 min. Aidan Murphy
1-1 82 min. Paul Lake (pen.)
Attendance: 7.602

 (Captain)

 

 

 

 (Captain)
 

Second leg
Maine Road, 29 April 1986
Manchester City - Manchester United 2–0 (1–0)
1-0 02 min. David Boyd
2-0 86 min. Paul Moulden
Attendance: 18.158

 (Captain)

 (Captain)

1984–85: Newcastle United vs Watford (0–0 and 4–1, 4–1 Aggregate)
Newcastle won the cup with a 4-1 second leg victory over Watford after the first leg ended in a goalless draw. Midfielder Paul Gascoigne scored a spectacular goal from 30 yards for the winners. Within five years, Gascoigne was a world class player for Tottenham Hotspur and England, having been transferred from Newcastle in 1988 for £2million. Newcastle's assistant manager Maurice Setters said "You'll have to wait a thousand years to see that again" in reference to Gascoigne's goal in this game.

1983–84: Everton vs Stoke City (2–2 and 2–0, 4–2 Aggregate)
First leg
Goodison Park, 26 April 1984
Everton - Stoke City 2–2
Everton: Wakenshaw, Rimmer
Stoke: Howells, Sutton

Second leg
Victoria Ground, 8 May 1984
Stoke City - Everton 0–2
Everton: Hughes, Wakenshaw

1982–83: Norwich City vs Everton (3–2 and 3–3 aet, 6–5 Aggregate)

1981–82: Watford vs Manchester United (3–2 and 4–4 aet, 7–6 Aggregate)
First leg
Old Trafford, 26 April 1982
Manchester United - Watford 2–3 (1–1)
0-1 34 min. Neil Williams
1-1 44 min. Mark Dempsey
1-2 58 min. Jimmy Gilligan
1-3 77 min. Worrall Sterling
2-3 86 min. Clayton Blackmore
Attendance: 7.280

 (Captain)

 

 

 (Captain)

Second leg
Vicarage Road, 6 May 1982
Watford - Manchester United 4–4 aet 2–3 (2–1)
1-0 10 min. Billy Garton (own goal)
1-1 30 min. Mark Hughes
2-1 35 min. David Johnson
2-2 48 min. Mark Dempsey
2-3 77 min. Mark Hughes
3-3 92 min. Andy Hill (own goal)
3-4 100 min. Norman Whiteside
4-4 103 min. Jimmy Gilligan
Attendance: 8.160

 (Captain)

 (Captain)

1980–81: West Ham United vs Tottenham Hotspur (2–0 and 0–1, 2–1 Aggregate)

 (Captain)

    (first leg Mark Entwistle)

 

     (first leg unused)

1979–80: Aston Villa vs Manchester City (3–1 and 0–1, 3–2 Aggregate)

References

1980s
1979–80 in English football
1980–81 in English football
1981–82 in English football
1982–83 in English football
1983–84 in English football
1984–85 in English football
1985–86 in English football
1986–87 in English football
1987–88 in English football
1988–89 in English football